Canyon is an unincorporated place on the Agawa River in the Unorganized North part of Algoma District in northeastern Ontario, Canada. It lies on the Algoma Central Railway (ACR) main line, between Frater to the south and Eton to the north, and Canyon (Agawa) railway station is served by the ACR regular passenger train and the Agawa Canyon Tour Train.

References

Communities in Algoma District